The Eleventh Doctor comic stories ran in several regularly published titles: Doctor Who Magazine, Doctor Who Adventures and the American Doctor Who (2011). All of these comic strip adventures were supported by appearances in the Doctor Who annuals and Doctor Who Storybooks. The Eleventh Doctor also had the honour of featuring in an original graphic novel, The Only Good Dalek – something which hadn't happened since the Sixth Doctor appeared in The Age of Chaos.
 
Though this multi-titled existence was something he had inherited from the Tenth Doctor, he was the first incarnation of the Doctor to start out in comic strips in at least two simultaneous monthly publications. He was also the first incarnation of the Doctor to debut in a comic strip other than the one in Doctor Who Magazine since the Eighth Doctor premiered in Radio Times. Doctor Who Adventures published its first Eleventh Doctor story several weeks before DWM launched his series of adventures.

Comics

Doctor Who Magazine

Doctor Who Graphic Novels

Doctor Who Adventures

Doctor Who (2011)

Doctor Who Annuals

Titan Comics

Short stories

Doctor Who Annuals

See also
 Star Trek: The Next Generation/Doctor Who: Assimilation2
 List of Doctor Who comic stories
 First Doctor comic stories
 Second Doctor comic stories
 Third Doctor comic stories
 Fourth Doctor comic strips
 Fifth Doctor comic stories
 Sixth Doctor comic stories
 Seventh Doctor comic stories
 Eighth Doctor comic stories
 War Doctor comic stories
 Ninth Doctor comic stories
 Tenth Doctor comic stories
 Twelfth Doctor comic stories
 Dalek comic strips, illustrated annuals and graphic novels

Comics based on Doctor Who
Eleventh Doctor stories